Banking in Sierra Leone consists of a central bank, the Bank of Sierra Leone, seven commercial banks, and six community banks.

Banking sector
The Civil War destroyed many of the branches of the country's commercial banks and as of 2005 there were 34 commercial bank branches, the majority in the major towns. Procedures for obtaining loans have been assessed as very complicated and there is a relatively low ratio of private credit to GDP at just over 4 percent.

Community Banks
Community banks play the role of extended financial services to local communities which are not able to access the commercial banks. They are also designed to help development within Sierra Leone by supporting the government's microfinancing program and by empowering local communities.

See also
List of banks in Sierra Leone

References

Economy of Sierra Leone
Sierra Leone